Swamplord is the first studio album by the Finnish melodic death metal band Kalmah.

Critical reception

Reception of Swamplord was fairly positive. Andy Hinds of AllMusic praised the album and in particular, the keyboards on the album, stating they "heighten the drama, while adding texture to the quintet's crushing twin-guitar foundation." He also compared the vocals to that of At the Gates and Emperor.  Mark Gromen for Brave Words & Bloody Knuckles called the tracks on the album "Rapidly played hymns of blasphemy, with a high level of musicianship." Kevin Stewart-Panko of Exclaim! stated that "The classical influenced runs and keyboard swells are a nice touch as are the band's experiments with dissonance vs. consonance in 'Heritance of Berija.'" He also said that while the band isn't entirely original, "they do have their moments and provide a decent enough listen."

Track listing

Credits

Band members
 Antti Kokko − guitar
 Pekka Kokko − guitar, vocals
 Altti Veteläinen − bass guitar
 Pasi Hiltula − keyboard
 Petri Sankala − drums

Production
 Recorded and mixed at Tico-Tico Studios, Kemi, in September 2000.
 Produced by Kalmah and Ahti Kortelainen
 Mastered at Finnvox Studios by Mika Jussila

References

Kalmah albums
2000 debut albums
Century Media Records albums